Acrocercops eupetala is a moth of the family Gracillariidae. It is known from New South Wales and Queensland, Australia.

The larvae feed on Acacia decurrens. They probably mine the leaves of their host plant.

References

eupetala
Moths of Australia
Moths described in 1880